The Chuvash people are a Turkic ethnic group, a branch of Oghurs, native to an area stretching from the Volga-Ural region to Siberia. Most of them live in Chuvashia and the surrounding areas, although Chuvash communities may be found throughout the Russian Federation. They speak Chuvash, a unique Turkic language that diverged from other languages in the family more than a millennium ago.

Etymology 

There is no universally accepted etymology of the word Chuvash, but there are three main theories. The popular theory accepted by Chuvash people suggests that Chuvash is a Shaz-Turkic adaptation of Lir-Turkic Suvar (Sabir people), an ethnonym of people that are widely considered to be the ancestors of modern Chuvash people. Compare Lir-Turkic Chuvash: huran to Shaz-Turkic Tatar: qazan (‘cauldron’). One theory suggests that the word Chuvash may be derived from Common Turkic jăvaš ('friendly', 'peaceful'), as opposed to şarmăs ('warlike') Another theory is that the word is derived from the Tabghach, an early medieval Xianbei clan and founders of the Northern Wei dynasty in China.  The Old Turkic name Tabghach (Tuoba in Mandarin) was used by some Inner Asian peoples to refer to China long after this dynasty. Gerard Clauson has shown that through regular sound changes, the clan name Tabghach may have transformed to the ethnonym Chuvash.

Language 

The Chuvash language is a member of the Turkic language family and is the only Oghur Turkic language that survives. It's spoken in Chuvashia and nearby regions along the middle course of the Volga River, in the central part of European Russia. Chuvash is the sole living representative of Volga Bulgar language or classified alongside Bulgar and Khazar language from Oghur branch A significantly divergent principal group itself. Since the surviving literary records for the non-Chuvash members of Oghuric are scant, the exact position of Chuvash within the Oghuric family cannot be determined. Some scholars suggest Hunnic had strong ties with Chuvash and refer to this extended grouping as separate Hunno-Bulgar languages.

Chuvash language is agglutinative in the structure of grammar, phonetically it is synharmonic. In this respect, it's almost no different from other Turkic and Uralic languages. Oghuric family is distinguished from the rest of the Turkic family by sound changes and it has a special place. The distinct character of Chuvash and its relation with the Finnic languages formerly led some scholars to think that Chuvash is a Turkified Finno-Ugric (Uralic) language while modern scholars generally believe it's an Oghuric language. Tatar and the neighbouring Volga Finns such as Mari have heavily influenced the Chuvash. Russian loans are also notable. It has two to three dialects.  Phenotypically, there is no particular differences among the Chuvash, as more Caucasoid or more Mongoloid phenotypes can be found among all subgroups.

The subdivision of the Chuvash people are as below:
Virjal or Turji (Chuvash: вирьял, тури, 'upper')
Anat jenchi ('mid-lower')
Anatri ('lower')
Hirti ('steppe') (this is a sub-group that is recognized by some researchers)

History 
The Turkic ancestors of the Chuvash people are believed to have come from central Siberia, where they lived in the Irtysh basin (between Tian Shan and Altay) from at least the end of the third millennium BC. In the early first century AD the Bulgars started moving west through Zhetysu and the steppes of modern-day Kazakhstan, reaching the North Caucasus in the 2nd to 3rd centuries AD. There they established several states (Old Bulgaria on the Black Sea coast and the Suar Duchy in modern-day Dagestan).

Old Bulgaria broke up in the second half of the 7th century after a series of successful Khazar invasions. Some of its population fled north, to the Volga-Kama region, where they established Volga Bulgaria, which eventually became extremely wealthy: its capital then being the 4th-largest city in the world. Shortly after that, the Suar Duchy was forced to become a vassal state of Khazaria. About half a century later, the Suars took part in the Arab–Khazar wars of 732–737. The adoption of Islam in the early tenth century in Volga Bulgaria led to most of its people embracing that religion.

After the Mongols destroyed Volga Bulgaria in 1236, the Golden Horde kept control of the region until its slow dissolution from  1438. The Kazan Khanate then became the new authority of the region and of the Chuvash. The modern name "Chuvash" began to appear in records starting from the sixteenth century from Russian and other foreign sources.

In 1552, the Russians conquered the Kazan Khanate and its territories. The Chuvash, required to pay yasak, gradually became dispossessed of much of their land. Many Chuvash who traditionally engaged in agriculture were forced to become bonded laborers in the timber industry or to work in barges due to growing poverty. The subsequent centuries saw the Christianization and Russification of the Chuvash. During this period, most Chuvash converted to Orthodox Christianity, but the Tsars never achieved their complete Russification. 

Russian Historian Vasily Nikitich Tatishchev personally visited the lands of Volga Bulgaria and wrote in 1768:

The eighteenth and nineteenth centuries saw the revival of Chuvash culture and the publication of many educational, literary, and linguistic works, along with the establishment of schools and other programs. The Chuvash language began to be used in local schools, and a special written script for the Chuvash language was created

in 1871.

On June 24, 1920, the Bolshevik government of the RSFSR established the Chuvash Autonomous Region; it became the Chuvash Autonomous Soviet Socialist Republic on April 21, 1925. Around this time Chuvash nationalism grew, but the Soviet authorities attempted to suppress nationalist movements by re-drawing the borders of the republic, leaving many Chuvash living in neighboring republics or in Russian districts. During most of the Soviet period of 1917-1991, the Chuvash were subjected to Russification campaigns and propaganda. The Chuvash language vanished from educational and public use. In 1989, another Chuvash cultural revival began - partly in response to these changes. Soon the Chuvash language once again came into use in educational, public, and political life.

, schools in the Chuvash Republic and in areas outside that have large Chuvash populations teach the Chuvash language and culture. Chuvash people around Russia also have media available to them in their local communities.

Origin 
There are two rival schools of thought on the origin of the Chuvash people. One is that they originated from a mixing between the Turkic Sabir tribes of Volga Bulgaria and also, according to some research, mixing with local Finno-Ugric populations. The other belief is that the Chuvash may have descended from pre-Volga Bulgars, based on a linguistic connection of the Chuvash with the Turkic language group.

The closest ancestors of the Chuvash people seem to be the Turkic Volga Bulgars. Naturally, they have been subjected to much infusion and influence, not only from Russian and Turkic peoples, but also from neighboring Finnic tribes, with whom they were persistently and mistakenly identified for centuries, perhaps aided by the fact that the Chuvash language is a highly divergent form of Turkic, and was not easily recognized as such.

Linguistic and ancestral connections have been thought to exist between Chuvash and Turkic Khazars as Volga Sabirs were at the service of Khazar Khanate and the languages of both nations are considered to share the Oghur branch of Turkic languages. Dieter Ludwig suggested that the Khazars were early Sabirs who had formed an alliance with the Uar of Khwarezm in his doctoral thesis (a people possibly linked to the White Huns and/or Pannonian Avars who later invaded Eastern Europe).

Genetics
Physical anthropologists using the racial frameworks of the early 20th century saw the Chuvash as a mixed Finno-Ugric and Turkic people. An autosomal analysis (2015) detected an indication of Oghur and possibly Bulgar ancestry in modern Chuvash. These Oghur and Bulgar tribes brought the Chuvash language with them. Another study found some Finno-Ugric components in Chuvash people. In 2017 a full genome study found Chuvash largely show a Finno-Ugric genetic component despite having a common Turkic component with Bashkir and Tatar peoples. This study supported elite domination hypothesis among Volga Turkic populations.

A genomic research found that Chuvashes have a linear relationship between Northeastern Europe and Western Siberia.  Volga-Uralic Turkic peoples (including Chuvashes, Tatars, and Bashkirs) displayed membership in the k5 cluster, which contained the Uralic populations. However, most of the time, the Volga Turkic peoples showed a higher combined presence of the “eastern components” k6 and k8 than did their geographic neighbors. In comparison with their neighbors, Chuvash has a foremost in the sharply increased frequency of haplogroups E and J which led geneticists to see the uniqueness of the gene pool. These haplogroups are typical to Near East and Caucasus.

In mtDNA, Volga-Ural variants belonged to haplogroups H, U, T, J, W, I, R, and N1 characteristic of West Eurasian populations. The most frequent were haplogroups H (12–42%) which may related to Caucasus, and U (18–44%) which may found in North and Northeastern European populations. East Eurasian mtDNA types (A, B, Y, F, M, N9) were also observed. In this study, haplogroup U5, related to mesolithic WHG, was not only observed in the Finno-Ugric populations, it also occurred at a high frequency in Bashkirs, Tatars, and Chuvash.

Culture
They speak the Chuvash language and have some pre-Christian traditions. The Chuvash have specific patterns used in embroidery, which is found in their traditional clothing. Many people also use the Russian and Tatar language. Spoken in Chuvashia and nearby regions along the middle course of the Volga River, in the central part of European.

Religion

Most Chuvash people are Eastern Orthodox Christians and belong to the Russian Orthodox Church. After the Russian subjugation of the Chuvash in the 16th century, a campaign of Christianization began. Most Chuvash did not convert until the mid-19th century. They retain some pre-Christian shamanism traditions in their cultural activities. They syncretized Orthodox Christianity and shamanism. Parallel pray in the shrines called  and sacrifice geese there. One of the main shrines is located in the town of Bilyarsk. Vattisen Yaly is a contemporary revival of the ethnic religion of the Chuvash people.

A minority of Chuvash follow Islam and they have also retained many traces of pre-Islamic beliefs and rituals. This minority probably adopted Islam as early as the Volga Bulgaria era but most of those Chuvash likely converted during the Golden Horde period. Some Chuvash who converted to Christianity following the Russian conquest reverted to Islam during the 19th and early 20th century.

See also

 List of Chuvashes
 Chuvash National Congress
 Chuvash National Museum
 Chuvash national symbols
 Chuvash State Academic Song and Dance Ensemble
 Chuvash Wikipedia
 ChuvashTet
 Society for the study of the native land

References

External links
 Photos of the Chuvash people

 
Ethnic groups in Russia
Turkic Christians
Turkic peoples of Europe